Shreekumar Ganesh is a Tamil television actor. He is best known for playing various roles in Super Hit Serials Anandham (2003–2009), Ahalya (2004–2006), Malargal (2005–2007), Bhandham (2006–2009), Idhayam (2009–2012) and Bommalattam (2012–2016) on Sun TV (India). He is noted for his leading roles in Sivasakthi (2008–2009), Naanal (2008–2009), Uravugal (2009-2012), Pillai Nila (2012–2014), Thalayanai Pookal (2016–2018), Devathayai Kanden (2017–2018) & Yaardai Nee Mohini (2018–2021). He has also appeared in a number of Tamil movies.

Personal life
Shree is the son of popular music director Ganesh, known for being part of the duo Shankar–Ganesh. His mother was a daughter of G.N.Velumani, a renowned Tamil movie producer in later 1950s to 1960s. Shree is a close friend of Kollywood actor Vijay and TV actors Sanjeev and Deepak Dinkar. Shreekumar and his co-star Shamitha had married in 2009. and they have two children.

Career
Shree started auditioning and landed Supporting comic roles in several Tamil Films such as Bambara Kannaley and television Series such as Ahalya (2004–2006), Bhandham (2006–2009), Megala (2007–2010), Sivasakthi (2008–2009) and Rudhra (2008–2009). He starred with Famous Actress Khushbu in the show. He became famous after the serial Sivasakthi where he acted as the son of Renuka / Sabitha Anand. In 2008, he starred in his first leading role in Kalaignar as Naanal serial and starred with Tamil Film actress Sonia Agarwal in the show. It was written and produced by Khushbu. He did another Supporting Character in Sathileelavathi Serial. It was a popular Serial in Kalaignar.

In 2009, Shree starred as brief role for nine episode in Sun TV Family series Uravugal (2009–2012). The same year, he was cast in Sun TV Family Medical serial Idhayam (2009–2012) alongside Seetha, Nithya Das and Sanjeev. The series was a Super hit success.

In 2012, he played the young father character in Sun TV family serial Pillai Nila (2012–2014) alongside Divya Padmini, Shamitha and Shyam Ganesh. Shree and Shamitha shared the screen space together after marriage. The same year, he was cast in Zee Tamil Romance and Family serial Thulasi (2012–2013) alongside Chandra Lakshman and Sanjeev. The same year, Shree co-starred alongside Sreeja and Delhi Kumar in Bommalattam (2012–2016), a family serial, where Shree portrayed a negative role with negative shades. It was a very successful serial in Sun TV.

In 2013, he played the police officer character in Star Vijay family and Romance serial Thayumanavan (2013) alongside Kalyani.

2016–2018: setbacks
In 2016 he played the brief police inspector character in Super Star Vijays 59th action thriller film Theri written and directed by Atlee and produced by Kalaipuli S. Thanu. In 2016, Shree starred in Zee Tamil family serial Thalayanai Pookal (2016–2018) alongside Nisha Krishnan and Anjali Rao.

Television

Serials

Telefilms

Reality shows/live shows

Filmography

Awards and honours

References 

 Living people
 Tamil male actors
 Tamil theatre
 Tamil male television actors
 Tamil television presenters
 Television personalities from Tamil Nadu
 Male actors from Tamil Nadu
 Male actors in Tamil cinema
 21st-century Tamil male actors
 Tamil Reality dancing competition contestants
 1978 births